The British Columbia Lottery Corporation is a Canadian Crown corporation offering a range of gambling (AKA gaming) products including lottery tickets, casinos and legal online gambling. It is based in Kamloops, with a secondary office in Vancouver. It consists of three business units, Lottery, Casino and eGaming; and five support divisions, Human Resources, Information Technology, Compliance & Security, Finance, and Communications. Its annual revenues exceed CDN $3.1 billion. It has 890 direct employees. Its service providers, who run casinos on its behalf under contract, have an additional 8,300 employees.

Background 
The British Columbia Lottery Corporation (BCLC) was incorporated under the provincial Company Act, subsequently replaced by the Business Corporations Act. While incorporated under the same law as other BC corporate entities, it is without share capital and has only one shareholder: the province itself. This ownership structure makes it what is known in Canada parlance as a "Crown corporation". To understand BCLC's corporate structure, one must also refer to the provincial Gaming Control Act (GCA), which stipulates that despite being incorporated under provincial company law, the provisions of the Business Corporations Act do not apply to BCLC. The GCA sets out that BCLC is to be governed by a board of up to 9 directors, whose members and chairperson are appointed by the executive council of the current provincial government.

The GCA mandates that BCLC is responsible for the conduct and management of all commercial gaming in British Columbia, including the ability to:

 Develop, organize and operate gaming on behalf of the province, either alone or in conjunction with the governments of other provinces
 Enter into agreements with the government of Canada, and governments of other provinces, to conduct and manage gaming in those provinces
 Supply operational services, computer software and other gaming-related technology, equipment and supplies
 Enter into agreements related to gaming services
 Determine the rules of play for lotteries and other games it is authorized to operate
 Monitor the compliance of gaming services providers with the GCA's requirements.
In 1969 the Canadian Criminal Code was amended to allow the federal and provincial governments to offer "lottery schemes".  At that time, lottery schemes were generally traditional lotteries where numbered tickets were purchased for chances to win large cash prizes in draws. In 1974, the provinces of British Columbia, Alberta, Saskatchewan and Manitoba formed the Western Canada Lottery Corporation (WCLC) to operate lotteries on their behalf. In 1982, Lotto 6/49 premiered as a nationwide lottery, which the WCLC operated on behalf of the four western provinces.

In 1985, after 10 years as a WCLC member, British Columbia decided to administer all lotteries in the province on its own behalf under a Crown corporation, BCLC. WCLC continues to operate the traditional national and regional lotteries for Alberta, Saskatchewan and Manitoba. 

In 1997, following further amendments to the Criminal Code, BCLC's mandate was expanded to give it responsibility for commercial casino and bingo operations across BC. Charitable gambling is also permitted, but does not fall within BCLC's mandate. In 2004 the corporation introduced PlayNow.com, Canada's first legal online gaming site. Initial offerings were limited to standard lottery products such as 6/49 draw tickets. In 2010 PlayNow was expanded by the addition of legal, regulated online casino games, a first in North America.

Business lines

Lottery 
Gambling products and services offered by BCLC's Lottery division include the national draw products Lotto Max, Lotto 6/49 and Daily Grand, and the BC-specific lottery products BC49, the Extra, Keno, Scratch & Win tickets, and Sports Action. 

Lottery products are sold primarily through sales agreements with private-sector retailers like pharmacies, gas stations and grocery stores.  

BCLC Lottery generated CDN$1.151 billion in the 2015–16 fiscal year.

Casino 
BCLC's Casino division provides traditional brick-and-mortar casino gambling services, including slot machines; a full range of live table games including blackjack, baccarat, poker, craps, roulette, sic bo and pai-gow; electronic table games; and bingo. Not all games are available at all facilities, but are determined by local market demand. BCLC operates 17 full-service casinos, 19 community gaming centres (slot machines and bingo only), and 6 bingo halls. 

BCLC Casino generated CDN$1.814 billion in the 2015/16 fiscal year.

eGaming 
BCLC's Internet gambling services are offered through its PlayNow.com platform. National and regional lottery tickets can be purchased on PlayNow. The eCasino offers online slot and other casino games, including poker; sports betting; and bingo. Up until 26 August 2021, sports betting was offered only on a parimutuel basis, where bets must be placed on the outcome of at least two events. This was due to a prohibition in the Canadian Criminal Code, which considered single-event bets as illegal. Additionally, the BC gaming regulator interpreted the Criminal Code as prohibiting bets on races and fights, which were allowed in other provinces.

On the 27th of August 2021, single-event betting became legal in Canada, and was left up to each province to decide how to implement and regulate this change. In the case of British Columbia, the province opted to expand the betting selection on the PlayNow platform. So, PlayNow now offers single-event bets, as well as sports like MMA that were not previously offered. PlayNow will likely remain the only regulated online betting option in British Columbia for now. 

BCLC eGaming generated CDN$135 million in the 2015/16 fiscal year.

Social responsibility

GameSense 
BCLC offers a responsible-gaming program, known as GameSense, to help players who have difficulty controlling the time and money they spend on gambling. It offers information and advice, online and through printed materials at BC casinos, as well as a toll-free telephone number: 1-888-795-6111. Most major casinos have GameSense advisers available to provide players and the general public with information on healthy gambling practices.

For those with serious problems controlling their behaviour, BCLC offers a voluntary self-exclusion program. Players who sign up for the program are prohibited from entering any casino in BC for a set period of time. Participants may choose 1-, 2- and 3-year periods of exclusion. While a participant is in the program, casino staff, especially security and surveillance staff, watch for the participant and require them to leave should they be found in or attempting to enter a casino. If a participant breaches their commitment and enters a casino undetected during their exclusion period, they are ineligible to win any prizes.

Participants in the voluntary self-exclusion program are offered unlimited professional counselling services at no cost. 

An academic review of the program reported that participants found the program helpful and effective.

Problem gambling 
People who have difficulty controlling their gambling are often described as having "gambling addictions", or being "problem gamblers". The American Psychiatric Association formally refers to compulsive gambling not as addiction, but a "gambling disorder". (See: Diagnostic and Statistical Manual – 5). 

The government of British Columbia uses the term problem gaming, and attempts to identify and track the scale of the problem through periodic prevalence surveys, the most recent of which was in 2014.

In the surveys, participants are asked the nine questions on the Canadian Problem Gambling Index. Based on their responses, respondents are classified into one of the following categories:

 Non-gamblers
 Non-problem gamblers
 Low at-risk problem gamblers
 Moderate at-risk problem gamblers
 High at-risk problem gamblers

3,058 adult British Columbians have been surveyed by telephone and online. The survey sample was not a random sample of all British Columbians, but was manipulated to deliver a minimum number of respondents from various regions of the province.

The 2014 survey found that estimates of possible problem gambling has declined from the previous survey in 2007. It reported that 2.6% of respondents were at moderate risk, and 0.7% at high risk. The survey's authors extrapolated these responses to the entire adult population of BC, concluding that it represented "an estimated 125,000 people considered to be problem gamblers". The results were entirely dependent on responses provided to the nine questions; no participants were assessed by qualified mental health professionals, or diagnosed as having gambling problems or disorders.

The survey's results are an estimate of the possible number of adults in the province who are at risk of being problem gamblers. The estimation of possible problem gamblers from the prevalence studies are frequently mischaracterized in media and official reports as the actual number individuals in the province experiencing problem gambling behaviours, rather than estimates of the possible number of individuals at risk of having or developing problem behaviours. BC's Public Health Officer represented the 2007 prevalence survey results as finding that more than 100,000 people were in fact problem gamblers. His report, Lower the Stakes: A Public Health Approach to Gambling in British Columbia, stated: "A combined total of 4.6 per cent (representing approximately 159,000 people in BC) were moderate-risk and problem gamblers"; and, "[h]owever, the percentage of problem gamblers more than doubled, increasing from 0.4 to 0.9 per cent. Based on BC Statistics's population estimates for 2002 and 2007, this represents an increase in the approximate number of problem gamblers in BC from nearly 13,000 to more than 31,000 in only five years." [Emphasis added]

The survey concluded that the prevalence of potential problem gambler's in the province is very low.

Casinos and money laundering

Definition 
Money laundering refers to the methods criminals use to make proceeds from their illicit activities appear to have originated from legitimate sources. Criminals engage in money laundering to protect themselves from prosecution and the forfeiture of their illicit proceeds.

Money is typically "laundered" in three phases: placement, layering and integration. The first phase, placement, occurs where illicitly acquired funds are put into the legitimate economy. This often occurs at a financial institution and is achieved by breaking large sums of cash into smaller amounts before making deposits into various bank accounts. Layering occurs when illegal funds are moved through a series of often complex transactions in an effort to disguise the funds, or to make it as difficult as possible to trace their origin. With placement and integration, money launderers take steps to hide not only the illegal source of the funds, but also their own identities, to prevent being linked to the illicit activities that generated the funds.

In the third phase, integration, the funds are used in legitimate transactions, such as the purchases of businesses, real estate, investments and luxury items.

Money launderers use various methods in casinos. They may "buy in" (obtain gaming tokens) with illicit cash, play with only a small amount of it, then cash out, requesting a cheque. The money launderer then claims that the funds are "winnings". Casinos counter this activity by different means:

 Not offering cheques
 Offering cheques only when they can confirm the funds are winnings
 Branding cheques either "return of buy-in funds" (indicating that the funds are not winnings) or "verified win" (only when the casino has tracked the player and can confirm the funds are winnings)

Responses  
In Canada, federal laws have been enacted in response to money laundering. Money laundering and the possession of the proceeds of crime are offences under the Criminal Code. Canada has legislation creating an anti-money-laundering and counter-terrorist-financing regime (AML/CFT), consisting of the Proceeds of Crime (Money Laundering) and the Terrorist Financing Act (PCMLTFA).   Some areas of the Canadian economy are considered more vulnerable to money laundering than others, including banking, securities dealers, money services businesses, real estate, and casinos. Companies in these sectors are deemed reporting entities under the PCMLTFA. The PCMLTFA also creates a financial intelligence unit (FIU); in Canada, that organization is the Financial Transaction and Analysis Centre of Canada (FINTRAC), which is responsible for the administration of Canada's AML/CTF regime.

Reporting entities, including casinos, are obligated to implement compliance programs to identify AML/CTF risks to their businesses and to put protections in place. A compliance program must include:

 A risk assessment
 Written policies and procedures
 A training program
 The appointment of a compliance officer
 An independent audit of the program once every two years

Reporting entities are obligated to report prescribed transactions to FINTRAC, including any cash transaction of CDN $10,000 or more; suspicious transactions and attempted suspicious transactions of any dollar amount; and certain electronic funds transfers. Reporting entities have a number of other obligations under the PCMLTFA, including:

 Ascertaining and confirming the identity of any person conducting a reportable transaction
 Keeping transaction records
 Monitoring customer transaction activity

FINTRAC analyzes reports from reporting entities to detect and deter money laundering. When its analysis identifies instances or suspected instances of money laundering, or individuals involved in money laundering, FINTRAC informs a police agency of that jurisdiction for the purposes of investigation and possible prosecution.

BCLC's anti-money laundering program 
BCLC has implemented an AML/CTF program designed to meet the requirements of the PCMLTFA. The program is routinely audited by FINTRAC and the provincial gaming regulator to ensure it meets legislative requirements and works effectively.

BCLC has made a clear public commitment to meeting its compliance obligations.

An independent report found that robust AML/CTF compliance programs were present in Canadian casinos.

References

External links
 Official Site - British Columbia Lottery Corporation

Lotteries in Canada
Crown corporations of British Columbia
Kamloops
Entertainment companies established in 1985
1985 establishments in British Columbia